Columbus City Hall may refer to:

Columbus City Hall (Indiana)
Columbus City Hall (Ohio)
Columbus City Hall (1872–1921)
Columbus City Hall (Wisconsin)

See also
 Columbus (disambiguation)
 Columbus City (disambiguation)